The 2001–02 Munster Rugby season was Munster's first season competing in the Celtic League, alongside which they also competed in the Heineken Cup. It was Declan Kidney's fourth season in his first spell as head coach of the province.

2001–02 squad

2001–02 Celtic League

Pool B Table

Quarter-final

Semi-final

Final

2001–02 IRFU Interprovincial Championship

Celtic League pool matches between Irish provinces count towards the Interprovincial Championship.

2001–02 Heineken Cup

Pool 4

Quarter-final

Semi-final

Final

Friendlies

References

External links
2001–02 Munster Rugby season official site 
2001–02 Munster Rugby Heineken Cup

2001-02
2001–02 in Irish rugby union